Steven Paul Fenwick (born 23 July 1951) is a Welsh former rugby union, and professional rugby league footballer who played in the 1970s and 1980s.

Background
Steve Fenwick was born in Caerphilly, Wales.

Rugby union career
Fenwick played rugby as a schoolboy for Caerphilly Grammar Technical School, and later joined Taffs Well RFC. In 1971 he switched to Beddau where he played 51 games before moving on the first class team Bridgend. While at Bridgend Fenwick earned all of his 30 international caps for Wales, making his début against France in 1975, in which he scored a try after only five minutes, and finished the game with a personal tally of 9 points. He was a member of the 1977 British Lions tour to New Zealand, in which he played in all four Tests. He also captained Wales in the Centenary game against the All Blacks in 1980. He also played for a World XV on 9 August 1980 against  in Buenos Aires, losing 36-22.

Rugby league career
In August 1981 Fenwick switched from rugby union to professional rugby league, signing to the Cardiff City Blue Dragons. He made his début for Cardiff against Salford scoring four goals in the match. Fenwick went on to win two caps with the Wales national rugby league team between 1981 and 1982 scoring five goals.

Before the start of the 1984/85 season, Cardiff City Blue Dragons relocated from Ninian Park in Cardiff, to Coychurch Road Ground in Bridgend, and were renamed Bridgend Blue Dragons.

Personal history
A former teacher, he set up in business with a former Wales and Lions player Tommy David, another player who had turned to league.

References

External links

1951 births
Living people
Barbarian F.C. players
Bridgend RFC players
British & Irish Lions rugby union players from Wales
Cardiff City Blue Dragons players
Dual-code rugby internationals
Rugby league players from Caerphilly
Rugby union centres
Rugby union players from Caerphilly
Wales international rugby union players
Wales national rugby league team players
Wales rugby union captains
Welsh rugby league players
Welsh rugby union players
Welsh schoolteachers